Euphaedra thierrybaulini is a butterfly in the family Nymphalidae. It is found in the Democratic Republic of the Congo (Bandundu, Kikwit, eastern Kasai).

References

Butterflies described in 1999
thierrybaulini
Endemic fauna of the Democratic Republic of the Congo
Butterflies of Africa